The Men's Greco-Roman Lightweight at the 1968 Summer Olympics as part of the wrestling program were held at the Insurgentes Ice Rink. The weight class allowed wrestlers of up to 70 kilograms to compete.

Results
The following wrestlers took part in the event:

References

Greco-Roman 70kg